Parviturbo is a genus of minute sea snails, marine gastropod mollusks in the family Skeneidae.

Description
The very small, solid shell is perforate or has a narrow umbilicus. It contains a few convex whorls. The protoconch consists of one or two smooth whorls. The turbinate or globoso-conic shell shows numerous subequal spiral cords with in their intervals well developed or weak cross threads. The dentition of the radula is rhipidoglossate.

Species
Species within the genus Parviturbo include:
 
 Parviturbo acuticostatus (Carpenter, 1864)
 Parviturbo agulhasensis (Thiele, 1925)
 Parviturbo alboranensis Peñas & Rolán, 2006
 Parviturbo alfredensis (Bartsch, 1915)
 Parviturbo annejoffeae Rubio, Rolán & Lee, 2015
 Parviturbo azoricus Rubio, Rolán & Segers, 2015
 Parviturbo billfranki Rubio, Rolán & Lee, 2015
 Parviturbo boucheti Rubio, Rolán & Fernández-Garcés, 2015
 Parviturbo brasiliensis Rubio, Rolán & Lee, 2015
 Parviturbo comptus (Woodring, 1928)
 Parviturbo copiosus Pilsbry & Olsson, 1945 
 Parviturbo dibellai Buzzurro & Cecalupo, 2007
 Parviturbo dengyanzhangi Rubio, Rolán & Lee, 2015
 Parviturbo dispar Rubio, Rolán & Letourneux, 2015
 † Parviturbo elegantulus (Philippi, 1844)
 Parviturbo ergasticus Rubio, Rolán & Gofas, 2015
 Parviturbo fenestratus (Chaster, 1896)
 Parviturbo fortius Rubio, Rolán & Fernández-Garcés, 2015
 Parviturbo gofasi Rubio, Rolán & Fernández-Garcés, 2015
 Parviturbo germanus Pilsbry & Olsson, 1945 
 Parviturbo granulum (Dall, 1889)
 Parviturbo guadeloupensis Rubio, Rolán & Fernández-Garcés, 2015
 Parviturbo insularis Rolán, 1988
 Parviturbo javiercondei Rubio, Rolán & Fernández-Garcés, 2015
 Parviturbo laevisculptus Renda, Raveggi, Bartolini, Micali & Giacobbe, 2019
 Parviturbo marcosi Rubio, Rolán & Fernández-Garcés, 2015
 † Parviturbo maturensis Jung, 1969 
 Parviturbo multispiralis Rubio, Rolán & Fernández-Garcés, 2015
 Parviturbo parvissima  (Hedley,  1899) 
 Parviturbo pombali Rubio, Rolán & Fernández-Garcés, 2015
 Parviturbo rectangularis Rubio, Rolán & Fernández-Garcés, 2015
 Parviturbo rehderi Pilsbry & McGinty, 1945
 Parviturbo robustior Rubio, Rolán & Lee, 2015
 Parviturbo rolani Engl, 2001
 Parviturbo seamountensis Rubio, Rolán & Gofas, 2015
 Parviturbo sola (Barnard, 1963)
 † Parviturbo sphaeroideus (S. V. Wood, 1842) 
 Parviturbo stearnsii (Dall, 1918)
 Parviturbo tuberculosus (d'Orbigny, 1842)
 Parviturbo vanuatuensis Rubio, Rolán & Fernández-Garcés, 2015
 † Parviturbo venezuelensis Weisbord, 1962 
 Parviturbo weberi Pilsbry & McGinty, 1945
 Parviturbo zylmanae Rubio, Rolán & Lee, 2015

Species brought into synonymy
 Parviturbo bellus Dall, 1889: synonym of Fossarus bellus Dall, 1889 
 Parviturbo calidimaris Pilsbry & McGinty, 1945: synonym of Haplocochlias calidimaris (Pilsbry & McGinty, 1945)
 Parviturbo concepcionensis (Lowe, 1935): synonym of Haplocochlias concepcionensis (Lowe, 1933)
 Parviturbo copiosus Pilsbry & Olsson, 1945: synonym of Parviturboides copiosus (Pilsbry & Olsson, 1945) (original combination)
 Parviturbo decussatus (Carpenter, 1857): synonym of Parviturboides decussatus (Carpenter, 1857) Parviturbo dibellai Buzzurro & Cecalupo, 2007: synonym of Fossarus eutorniscus Melvill, 1918: synonym of Conradia eutornisca (Melvill, 1918)
 Parviturbo erici (Strong & Hertlein, 1939): synonym of Haplocochlias erici (Strong & Hertlein, 1939)
 Parviturbo francesae Pilsbry & McGinty, 1945: synonym of Haplocochlias francesae (Pilsbry & McGinty, 1945)
 Parviturbo germanus Pilsbry & Olsson, 1945: synonym of Parviturboides germanus (Pilsbry & Olsson, 1945) (original combination)
  † Parviturbo lecointreae (Dollfus & Dautzenberg, 1899): synonym of  † Pareuchelus lecointreae (Dollfus & Dautzenberg, 1899) (superseded combination)
 Parviturbo parvissimus (Hedley, 1899): synonym of Lophocochlias parvissimus (Hedley, 1899)
 Parviturbo turbinus (Dall, 1889): synonym of Haplocochlias turbinus (Dall, 1889)
 Parviturbo zacalles Mazyck, 1913: synonym of Parviturboides interruptus (C. B. Adams, 1850)

References

 Pilsbry H.A. & McGinty T.L. (1945). "Cyclostrematidae" and Vitrinellidae of Florida. I. Nautilus, 59(1): 1-13, pl. 1-2; II, Nautilus, 59(2): 52-60, pl. 6
 Gofas, S.; Le Renard, J.; Bouchet, P. (2001). Mollusca, in: Costello, M.J. et al. (Ed.) (2001). European register of marine species: a check-list of the marine species in Europe and a bibliography of guides to their identification. Collection Patrimoines Naturels, 50: pp. 180–213
 Rolán E., 2005. Malacological Fauna From The Cape Verde Archipelago. Part 1, Polyplacophora and Gastropoda. Spencer, H.; Marshall. B. (2009). All Mollusca except Opisthobranchia''. In: Gordon, D. (Ed.) (2009). New Zealand Inventory of Biodiversity. Volume One: Kingdom Animalia. 584 pp
 Rubio F., Rolán E. & Fernández-Garcés R. (2015). Revision of the genera Parviturbo and Pseudorbis (Gastropoda, Skeneidae). Iberus. 33(2): 167-259

External links
 Pilsbry, H. A. & McGinty, T. L. (1945). Cyclostrematidae and Vitrinellidae of Florida- I. The Nautilus. 59(1): 1-13, pls 1-2

 
Skeneidae
Gastropod genera